The 2006–07 Los Angeles Lakers season was the 59th season of the franchise in the National Basketball Association (NBA) and the 61st overall. The season ended with the Lakers being eliminated in five games in a rematch against the Phoenix Suns from the 2006 playoffs (which the Suns won in seven games) in the First Round of the playoffs. It was the first season that Kobe Bryant switched from jersey number 8 to 24.

The Lakers finished in second place in the Pacific Division, 7th seed in the playoffs. Ultimately, even though team captain Bryant was the leading NBA scorer with 31.6 PPG, the Lakers were defeated in five games by the Suns. This was the second consecutive season where the Lakers had their season ended by the Suns.

Draft picks

In the NBA draft, the Lakers, as expected, chose young talent. In the draft, the Lakers selected Jordan Farmar, the PG for UCLA with 26th pick. Los Angeles also traded their 51st pick (Cheick Samb) to the Detroit Pistons for SF Maurice Evans.  The Lakers also had a trade with the Dallas Mavericks, trading away a future second round pick for J. R. Pinnock.

Roster

Injuries and surgeries
Besides the signings, L.A.'s most notable move was the injury bug. Kobe Bryant, the reigning scoring champion had successful surgery on his knee and would decline playing for Team USA at the 2006 World Championship, where they finished 3rd, with bronze.

Center Chris Mihm, who was the starting big man before having an ankle injury, also underwent successful surgery and was not expected to play at all in the upcoming season.

Regular season

The beginning success 
The Lakers started their season opener hosting the Phoenix Suns, the team who knocked them out of the playoffs. Kobe Bryant was out, allowing Maurice Evans to play in his place. Centers Kwame Brown and Chris Mihm were out on injury, forcing Bynum in their place.

Even with two of their starters out on injuries, it didn't seem to affect the team, as Odom led the team until Bryant recovered. The next night at Oracle Arena against the Golden State Warriors, Odom had stats, almost recording his first triple-double of the season, 22 points with nine rebounds and nine assists. Ronny Turiaf, known for his sideline celebrations, had career-highs in almost every category, including 23 points and nine rebounds for a 110-98 win. Bryant also sat this out.

Going downhill 
By March, the Lakers were in disarray. Radmanović was fined $500,000 for lying to the organization about his injury, Walton, Brown and Odom were playing on injuries, and despite some 40-point games, Bryant was unable to stop the Lakers fall. Coach Jackson suffered his first seven-game losing streak of his career in result. It seemed impossible for the Lakers to make the playoffs. Bryant decided to step his game up even further.

In the March 16th game against the Portland Trail Blazers, Bryant recorded his second-highest outbreak of his career with 65 points, single-handedly winning the game after being down by 12 with four minutes in regulation.

He continued by getting 50, 60, and another 50 in games against the Minnesota Timberwolves, Memphis Grizzlies and New Orleans Hornets respectively. By doing so, Bryant recorded the second-longest streak of scoring 50+ points in NBA history behind Wilt Chamberlain. Two days after his game against New Orleans, Kobe ended his streak in a game against the Golden State Warriors in Los Angeles with 43 points. Bryant's high scoring month continued. He scored 53 in an overtime loss against the Houston Rockets two games later.

But Bryant's scoring binge, which led to the team's five-game winning streak, was followed by the aforementioned seven-game losing streak. Throughout the season, the Lakers were 14-6 in games where Bryant scored 40+ points.

Season standings

Record vs. opponents

Playoffs

|- align="center" bgcolor="#ffcccc"
| 1
| April 22
| @ Phoenix
| L 87–95
| Kobe Bryant (39)
| Lamar Odom (16)
| Luke Walton (6)
| US Airways Center18,422
| 0–1
|- align="center" bgcolor="#ffcccc"
| 2
| April 24
| @ Phoenix
| L 98–126
| Kobe Bryant (15)
| Andrew Bynum (12)
| Kobe Bryant (5)
| US Airways Center18,422
| 0–2
|- align="center" bgcolor="#ccffcc"
| 3
| April 26
| Phoenix
| W 95–89
| Kobe Bryant (45)
| Lamar Odom (16)
| Kobe Bryant (6)
| Staples Center18,997
| 1–2
|- align="center" bgcolor="#ffcccc"
| 4
| April 29
| Phoenix
| L 100–113
| Kobe Bryant (31)
| Lamar Odom (19)
| Kobe Bryant (9)
| Staples Center18,997
| 1–3
|- align="center" bgcolor="#ffcccc"
| 5
| May 2
| @ Phoenix
| L 110–119
| Kobe Bryant (34)
| Odom, Turiaf (10)
| Odom, Farmar (2)
| US Airways Center18,422
| 1–4
|-

Player statistics

Regular season

Playoffs

Awards and records
SG Kobe Bryant
All-NBA First Team
NBA All-Defensive First Team
2007 NBA All-Star MVP
06-07 NBA scoring champion (31.6 PPG)

Transactions
In their most notable move, L.A. signed three-point specialist PF Vladimir Radmanović to a five year/$31 million  contract from cross-town rivals Clippers. Addressing the need for veterans, they also signed PG Shammond Williams for a one-year, $5 million deal. To make ties with existing players, L.A. signed Brian Cook to a 3-year extension.

Devean George, who won three titles with the Lakers in the early 2000s declined FA and signed with the Mavericks, leaving Bryant the remaining player from the glory days.

Most of the signings the Lakers did was sign and cut/trade. Pinnock, Mamadou N'diaye, Marcus Douthit and Devin Green were all cut before the season started.

References

External links
L.A. Laker Official Site
L.A. Laker Roster Stats for 2006-07
2006-07 Schedule

Los Angeles Lakers seasons
Los Angle
Los Angle
Los Angle